Vinicius Duarte (born 3 December 1996), commonly known as Vico, is a Brazilian footballer who plays as a forward for Vitória.

Career statistics

Club

Notes

References

External links

1996 births
Living people
Brazilian footballers
Association football forwards
Grêmio Foot-Ball Porto Alegrense players
Associação Atlética Ponte Preta players
Esporte Clube Vitória players
Campeonato Brasileiro Série A players
Campeonato Brasileiro Série B players